Abilene Reporter-News is a daily newspaper based in Abilene, Texas, United States. The newspaper started publishing as the weekly Abilene Reporter, helmed by Charles Edwin Gilbert on June 17, 1881, just three months after Abilene was founded. It is hence the oldest continuous business in the city. It became a daily newspaper in 1885.

History 
Two months after starting the paper, a fire destroyed several buildings in Abilene, including Gilbert's office. He rode the train 21 miles east to Baird and used a borrowed printing press to produce an extra edition on the fire. Two other Abilene papers began publication in the 1880s.

The newspaper, owned in the early 1920s by Bernard Hanks, became one of the two original flagships of the Harte-Hanks newspaper chain in 1924.

In 1937, the company merged its morning paper, The Morning News, with the afternoon Daily Reporter to form the Abilene Reporter-News. The newspaper published morning and evening editions into the 1950s.

The E. W. Scripps Company bought the newspaper, along with other Texas-based Harte-Hanks papers, in 1997. The company spun out its newspaper assets into Journal Media Group in April 2015.

References

External links

Daily newspapers published in Texas
Gannett publications
Abilene, Texas
Mass media in Abilene, Texas
Publications established in 1881
1881 establishments in Texas